Akorede Alli is a Nigerian film director and the chief executive officer of Modern Eko Studio. He is known for his directing role in Ran Mi Lowo.

Early life and education 
Alli is a Yoruba tribe born and bred in the royal family of Akinsemoyin in Lagos, Nigeria. He obtained his Film Director Certificate from PEFTI Film Institute, in Nigeria and moved to United States where he  studied Film Making and Advanced Cinematography at the School of Visual Arts in New York City

Career 
He started his acting, film directing and producing career in California. He eventually established a production company called Modern Eko, a company that produced his first Nigerian film; Ran Mi Lowo.

References

External links 
 

Yoruba filmmakers
Nigerian film directors
Nigerian male film actors
Nigerian film producers
Nigerian chief executives
School of Visual Arts alumni
Nigerian cinematographers
Year of birth missing (living people)
Living people